The Sexual Compulsivity Scale (SCS) - Sexual Sensation Seeking and Sexual Compulsivity Scale - is a psychometric measure of a high libido, hypersexuality and sexual addiction. It was developed by Seth Kalichman. It consists of statements that must be rated on how much the taker agrees with them.

Scores on the SCS have been found to predict a range of health outcomes.

Sexual Sensation Seeking and Sexual Compulsivity Scale

Related scales 
 Sexual Compulsivity Scale - 
 Dyadic Sexual Communication Scale (DSC)
 Interpersonal Sexual Objectification Scale (ISOS)
 Sexual Relationship Power Scale
 Sexual Satisfaction Scale (SSS)
 Sexual Self-Efficacy Scale-Erectile Functioning (SSES-E)
 The Sexual Relationship Scale (SRS)
 The Sexual Self-Disclosure Scale (SSDS)
 Sexual Self-Efficacy Scale-Erectile Functioning (SSES-E)

References 

 Bankole A. Johnson. "Addiction Medicine: Science and Practice". pg. 668

External links 
 Online version of the Sexual Compulsivity Scale (dead link, Aug 16, 2015)

Mental disorders screening and assessment tools
Sexual addiction